John Moore House may refer to:

Canada
John Moore House (Sparta, Ontario)

United States
John Moore House (Windsor, Connecticut), see List of the oldest buildings in Connecticut
John Moore House (Francisville, Kentucky), listed on the NRHP in Boone County, Kentucky
John Moore House (Edgecomb, Maine), listed on the NRHP in Lincoln County, Maine
John Covington Moore House, Tusquitee, North Carolina, NRHP-listed
John and Helen Moore House, Moro, Oregon, NRHP-listed
John and Mary Moore House, Brownsville, Oregon, listed on the NRHP in Linn County, Oregon
John M. and Lottie D. Moore House, Richmond, Texas, NRHP-listed
John Moore House (Lexington, Virginia), NRHP-listed

See also
Moore House (disambiguation)